Aarts is a Dutch patronymic surname ("son of Aart"). Notable people with the surname include:

 Harry Aarts (1930–2020), Dutch politician
 Johannes Josephus Aarts (1871–1934), Dutch artist
 Kees Aarts (1941–2008), Dutch footballer
 Kees Aarts (born 1959), Dutch political scientist
 Maaike Aarts (born 1976), Dutch violinist
 Marcel Aarts (born 1983), Dutch basketball player
 Laura Aarts (born 1996), Dutch water polo player
 Ronald M. Aarts (born 1956), Dutch electrical engineer and physicist 

Aarts (Mongolian аарц) is also a Mongolian dairy product.

See also 
 Aarts, a Dutch automobile brand
 Aerts (surname)
 Association of Advanced Rabbinical and Talmudic Schools (AARTS)

References 

Dutch-language surnames
Patronymic surnames